Anne Louise Morrissy Merick (October 28, 1933 – May 2, 2017) was a pioneering American journalist, best known for persuading the Pentagon to reverse an order, known as the "Westmoreland Edict", which effectively prevented female reporters from accompanying troops to the front lines in the Vietnam War.

The edict had been issued by William Westmoreland. Westmoreland was the General appointed to take control of the US troops in Vietnam in 1964. The edict forbade women to be with troops overnight.

Merick, then working in Saigon for ABC, she and Ann Bryan Mariano organized women journalists to meet with the Ministry of Defense, who subsequently reversed the order.

As a student sports journalist in the 1950s at Cornell University, she received national attention for her struggle to succeed despite sexism. She was the first woman sports editor at Cornell, and the first woman journalist credentialed for the press box at prestigious universities such as Cornell and Yale.

References

Further reading
 Morrisy Merick et al., War Torn: Stories of War from the Women Reporters Who Covered Vietnam (2002)
 Joyce Hoffmann, On Their Own: Women Journalists and the American Experience in Vietnam (2008)

1933 births
2017 deaths
Journalists from New York City
American women journalists
Cornell University alumni
Deaths from dementia in Florida
People from Manhattan
21st-century American women